The 2022 GMR Grand Prix was the fifth round of the 2022 IndyCar season. The race was held on May 14, 2022, in Speedway, Indiana at the Indianapolis Motor Speedway. The race was originally scheduled for 85 laps, but under INDYCAR rules, the race was declared a wet race at the start, meaning the race was limited to two hours.

Entry list

Practice

Practice 1

Practice 2

Qualifying

Qualifying classification 

 Notes
 Bold text indicates fastest time set in session.

Warmup

Race 
Originally set for a 3:46 PM ET start, the race was originally set for 3:07 PM ET on May 14, 2022.  After a lightning delay caused the Indy Lights race to be suspended and resumed after the NTT IndyCar Series feature, the race started at 3:46 PM ET as planned.  As it was declared a wet race, series officials removed the initial 85 lap distance and replaced it with a two hour time limit.

Race classification 

 Race shortened to two-hour timed race.

 Race ended under caution period.

Championship standings after the race 

Drivers' Championship standings

Engine manufacturer standings

 Note: Only the top five positions are included.

References

Grand Prix of Indianapolis
GMR Grand Prix
GMR Grand Prix
GMR Grand Prix